Cazilhac may refer to the following places in France:

Cazilhac, Aude, a commune in the Aude department 
Cazilhac, Hérault, a commune in the Hérault department